The Battle of Thasos was fought on October 829 between the fleets of the Byzantine Empire and the newly founded Emirate of Crete. The Cretan Arabs scored a major victory: Theophanes Continuatus records that almost the entire imperial fleet was lost. This success opened up the Aegean to the Saracens' raids. The Cyclades and other islands were pillaged, and Mount Athos was so devastated that it was deserted for a long time.

Sources
 
 * 

Thasos
Thasos
Thasos
820s in the Byzantine Empire
Medieval Aegean Sea
Thasos
829
Thasos